Edward (Eddie) Sansbury (born 26 November 1983) is an Australian rules football player who formerly played as a midfielder for the Kangaroos Football Club in the Australian Football League.

He was drafted to the Kangaroos as a third round selection at pick 40 in the 2003 AFL Draft from the Central District Bulldogs in the South Australian National Football League. In the 2003 SANFL grand final he kicked 5 goals against the future Brownlow Medalist Adam Cooney.

Eddie played as a forward midfielder during his career.  In Round 22 of 2007, Sansbury kicked 5 goals in the 64 point win over the Western Bulldogs. He had his best season in Kangaroo colours to date.  However Sansbury was delisted at the end of the 2008 season after only playing one game during the season.  In 2009, he has returned to Adelaide and to Central District.

Sansbury is the father of St Kilda footballer Nasiah Wanganeen-Milera, as well as the cousin of Sydney's Michael O'Loughlin and Kangaroo team-mate Daniel Wells.

Achievements 
Career Games - 40

Career Goals - 21

Draft History - Pick 40 (2003)

Brownlow Votes - 3

Career Finals - 3

External links

 
 

1983 births
Living people
North Melbourne Football Club players
Indigenous Australian players of Australian rules football
Central District Football Club players
Australian rules footballers from South Australia
Aspley Football Club players
Palmerston Football Club players
Wanderers Football Club players
Port Melbourne Football Club players
North Ballarat Football Club players
Broadbeach Australian Football Club players